Gordon Matthew Thomas Sumner  (born 2 October 1951), known as Sting, is an English musician and actor. He was the frontman, songwriter and bassist for new wave rock band the Police from 1977 until their breakup in 1986. He launched a solo career in 1985 and has included elements of rock, jazz, reggae, classical, new-age, and worldbeat in his music.

As a solo musician and a member of the Police, Sting has received 17 Grammy Awards: he won Song of the Year for "Every Breath You Take", three Brit Awards, including Best British Male Artist in 1994 and Outstanding Contribution in 2002, a Golden Globe, an Emmy, and four nominations for the Academy Award for Best Original Song. In 2019, he received a BMI Award for "Every Breath You Take" becoming the most-played song in radio history. In 2002, Sting received the Ivor Novello Award for Lifetime Achievement from the British Academy of Songwriters, Composers and Authors and was also inducted into the Songwriters Hall of Fame. He was inducted into the Rock and Roll Hall of Fame as a member of the Police in 2003. In 2000, he received a star on the Hollywood Walk of Fame for recording. In 2003, Sting received a CBE from Elizabeth II at Buckingham Palace for services to music. He was made a Kennedy Center Honoree at the White House in 2014 and was awarded the Polar Music Prize in 2017.

With the Police, Sting became one of the world's best-selling music artists. Solo and with the Police combined, he has sold over 100 million records. In 2006, Paste ranked him 62nd of the 100 best living songwriters. He was 63rd of VH1's 100 greatest artists of rock, and 80th of Q magazine's 100 greatest musical stars of the 20th century. He has collaborated with other musicians on songs such as "Money for Nothing" with Dire Straits, "Rise & Fall" with Craig David, "All for Love" with Bryan Adams and Rod Stewart, "You Will Be My Ain True Love" with Alison Krauss, and introduced the North African music genre raï to Western audiences through the hit song "Desert Rose" with Cheb Mami. In 2018, he released the album 44/876, a collaboration with Jamaican musician Shaggy, which won the Grammy Award for Best Reggae Album in 2019.

Early life

Gordon Matthew Thomas Sumner was born at Sir G B Hunter Memorial Hospital in Wallsend, Northumberland, England, on 2 October 1951, the eldest of four children of Audrey (née Cowell), a hairdresser, and Ernest Matthew Sumner, a milkman and engineer. He grew up near Wallsend's shipyards, which made an impression on him. As a child, he was inspired by the Queen Mother waving at him from a Rolls-Royce to divert from the shipyard prospect towards a more glamorous life. He helped his father deliver milk and by ten was "obsessed" with an old Spanish guitar left by an emigrating friend of his father.

He attended St Cuthbert's Grammar School in Newcastle upon Tyne. He visited nightclubs such as Club A'Gogo to see Cream and Manfred Mann, who influenced his music. After leaving school in 1969, he enrolled at the University of Warwick in Coventry, but left after a term. After working as a bus conductor, building labourer and tax officer, he attended the Northern Counties College of Education (now Northumbria University) from 1971 to 1974 and qualified as a teacher. He taught at St Paul's First School in Cramlington for two years.

Sting performed jazz in the evenings, on weekends, and during breaks from college and teaching, playing with the Phoenix Jazzmen, Newcastle Big Band and Last Exit. He gained his nickname after his habit of wearing a black and yellow jumper with hooped stripes with the Phoenix Jazzmen. Bandleader Gordon Solomon thought he looked like a bee (or according to Sting himself, "they thought I looked like a wasp"), which prompted the name "Sting". In the 1985 documentary Bring On the Night a journalist called him Gordon, to which he replied, "My children call me Sting, my mother calls me Sting, who is this Gordon character?" In 2011, he told Time that "I was never called Gordon. You could shout 'Gordon' in the street and I would just move out of your way".

Musical career

1977–1984: The Police and early solo work

In January 1977, Sting moved from Newcastle to London and joined Stewart Copeland and Henry Padovani (soon replaced by Andy Summers) to form the Police. From 1978 to 1983, they had five UK chart-topping albums, won six Grammy Awards and won two Brit Awards (for Best British Group and for Outstanding Contribution to Music). Their initial sound was punk-inspired, but they switched to reggae rock and minimalist pop. Their final album, Synchronicity, was nominated for five Grammy Awards including Album of the Year in 1983. It included their most successful song, "Every Breath You Take", written by Sting.

According to Sting, appearing in the documentary Last Play at Shea, he decided to leave the Police while onstage during a concert of 18 August 1983 at Shea Stadium in New York City because he felt that playing that venue was "[Mount] Everest". While never formally breaking up, after Synchronicity, the group agreed to concentrate on solo projects. As the years went by, the band members, especially Sting, dismissed the possibility of reforming. In 2007, however, the band did reform and undertook a reunion tour.

Four of the band's five studio albums appeared on Rolling Stone's list of the 500 Greatest Albums of All Time and two of the band's songs, "Every Breath You Take" and "Roxanne", each written by Sting, appeared on Rolling Stone's 500 Greatest Songs of All Time. In addition, "Every Breath You Take" and "Roxanne" were among the Rock and Roll Hall of Fame's 500 Songs that Shaped Rock and Roll. In 2003, the band was inducted into the Rock and Roll Hall of Fame. They were also included in Rolling Stone's and VH1's lists of the "100 Greatest Artists of All Time".

In 1978, Sting collaborated with members of Hawkwind and Gong as the Radio Actors on the one-off single "Nuclear Waste". In September 1981, Sting made his first live solo appearance, on all four nights of the fourth Amnesty International benefit The Secret Policeman's Other Ball in London's Drury Lane theatre at the invitation of producer Martin Lewis. He performed solo versions of "Roxanne" and "Message in a Bottle". He also led an all-star band (dubbed "the Secret Police") on his own arrangement of Bob Dylan's "I Shall Be Released". The band and chorus included Eric Clapton, Jeff Beck, Phil Collins, Bob Geldof and Midge Ure, all of whom (except Beck) later worked on Live Aid. His performances were in the album and movie of the show. The Secret Policeman's Other Ball began his growing involvement in political and social causes. In 1982 he released a solo single, "Spread a Little Happiness" from the film of the Dennis Potter television play Brimstone and Treacle. The song was a reinterpretation of the 1920s musical Mr. Cinders by Vivian Ellis and a Top 20 hit in the UK.

1985–1989: Solo debut

His first solo album, 1985's The Dream of the Blue Turtles, featured jazz musicians including Kenny Kirkland, Darryl Jones, Omar Hakim and Branford Marsalis. It included the hit singles "If You Love Somebody Set Them Free" (backed with the non-LP song "Another Day"), "Fortress Around Your Heart", "Love Is the Seventh Wave" and "Russians", the latter of which was based on a theme from the Lieutenant Kijé Suite. Within a year, the album reached Triple Platinum. The album received Grammy nominations for Album of the Year, Best Male Pop Vocal Performance, Best Jazz Instrumental Performance and Best Engineered Recording.

In November 1984, Sting was part of Band Aid's "Do They Know It's Christmas?", which raised money for famine victims in Ethiopia. Released in June 1985, Sting sang the line "I Want My MTV" on "Money for Nothing" by Dire Straits. In July 1985, Sting performed Police hits at the Live Aid concert at Wembley Stadium in London. He also joined Dire Straits in "Money for Nothing" and he sang two duets with Phil Collins. In 1985, Sting provided spoken vocals for the Miles Davis album You're Under Arrest, taking the role of a French-speaking police officer. He also sang backing vocals on Arcadia's single "The Promise", on two songs from Phil Collins' album No Jacket Required, and contributed "Mack the Knife" to the Hal Willner-produced tribute album Lost in the Stars: The Music of Kurt Weill. In September 1985, he performed "If You Love Somebody Set Them Free" at the 1985 MTV Video Music Awards at the Radio City Music Hall in New York. The 1985 film Bring On the Night, directed by Michael Apted, documented the formation of his solo band and its first concert in France.

Sting released ...Nothing Like the Sun in 1987, including singles, "We'll Be Together", "Fragile", "Englishman in New York" and "Be Still My Beating Heart", dedicated to his mother, who had recently died. It went Double Platinum. "The Secret Marriage" from this album was adapted from Hanns Eisler and "Englishman in New York" was about Quentin Crisp. The album's title is from William Shakespeare's Sonnet 130. The album won Best British Album at the 1988 Brit Awards and in 1989 received three Grammy nominations including his second consecutive nomination for Album of the Year. "Be Still My Beating Heart" earned nominations for Song of the Year and Best Male Pop Vocal Performance. In 1989, ...Nothing Like the Sun was ranked number 90 and his Police album Synchronicity was ranked number 17 on Rolling Stones 100 greatest albums of the 1980s.

In February 1988, he made Nada como el sol, four songs from Nothing like the Sun he sang in Spanish and Portuguese. In 1987, jazz arranger Gil Evans placed him in a big band setting for a live album of Sting's songs, and on Frank Zappa's 1988 Broadway the Hard Way he performed an arrangement of "Murder by Numbers", set to "Stolen Moments" by Oliver Nelson and dedicated to evangelist Jimmy Swaggart. In October 1988 he recorded a version of Igor Stravinsky's The Soldier's Tale with the London Sinfonietta conducted by Kent Nagano. It featured Vanessa Redgrave, Ian McKellen, Gianna Nannini and Sting as the soldier.

1990–1997: Greater solo success
His 1991 album, The Soul Cages, was dedicated to his late father. It included "All This Time" and the Grammy-winning title track. The album went Platinum. The album also included an Italian version of Mad About You. The text was written by his friend Zucchero Fornaciari. The song was then included in Overdose d'amore/The Ballads (1999) and in Zu & Co. (2004) of the Italian bluesman. The following year, he married Trudie Styler and was awarded an honorary doctorate in music from Northumbria University. In 1991, he appeared on Two Rooms: Celebrating the Songs of Elton John and Bernie Taupin. He performed "Come Down in Time" for the album, which also features other popular artists and their renditions of John/Taupin songs.

Sting's fourth album Ten Summoner's Tales peaked at two in the UK and US album charts in 1993 and went triple platinum in just over a year. The album was recorded at his Elizabethan country home, Lake House in Wiltshire. Ten Summoner's Tales was nominated for the Mercury Prize in 1993 and for the Grammy for Album of the Year in 1994. The title is a wordplay on his surname, Sumner and "The Summoner's Tale", one of The Canterbury Tales by Geoffrey Chaucer. Hit singles on the album include "Fields of Gold", a song inspired by the barley fields next to his Wiltshire home, with the music video featuring a silhouette of Sting walking through a village containing common features seen throughout the UK during that time such as a red telephone box and "If I Ever Lose My Faith in You", the latter earning his second award for best male pop singer at the 36th Grammy Awards.

In May 1993, he covered his own Police song from the Ghost in the Machine album, "Demolition Man", for the Demolition Man film. With Bryan Adams and Rod Stewart, Sting performed "All for Love" for the film The Three Musketeers. The song stayed at the top of the U.S. charts for three weeks, topped multiple other charts worldwide and reached number two in the UK. In February, he won two Grammy Awards and was nominated for three more. Berklee College of Music awarded him his second honorary doctorate of music in May. In November, he released the compilation, Fields of Gold: The Best of Sting, which was certified Double Platinum. That year, he sang with Vanessa Williams on "Sister Moon" and appeared on her album The Sweetest Days. At the 1994 Brit Awards in London, he was Best British Male.

Sting's 1996 album, Mercury Falling debuted strongly, with the single "Let Your Soul Be Your Pilot" reaching No. 15 in the UK Singles Chart, but the album soon dropped from the charts. He reached the UK Top 40 with two further singles the same year with "You Still Touch Me" (#27 in June) and "I Was Brought To My Senses" (#31 in December). The song "I'm So Happy I Can't Stop Crying" from this album also became a US country music hit in 1997 in a version with Toby Keith. Sting recorded music for the Disney film Kingdom of the Sun, which was reworked into The Emperor's New Groove. The film's overhauls and plot changes were documented by Sting's wife, Trudie Styler, as the changes resulted in some songs not being used.
Also in 1996, he sang for the Tina Turner single "On Silent Wings" as a part of her Wildest Dreams album. In the same year, his performance with the Brazilian composer/artist Tom Jobim in "How Insensitive" was in the AIDS benefit album Red Hot + Rio produced by the Red Hot Organization. Sting cooperated with Greek singer George Dalaras in a concert in Athens. "Moonlight", a rare jazz performance by Sting for the 1995 remake of Sabrina, written by Alan Bergman, Marilyn Bergman and John Williams, was nominated for a 1997 Grammy Award for Best Song Written for a Motion Picture or Television. On 4 September 1997, Sting performed "I'll Be Missing You" with Puff Daddy at the 1997 MTV Video Music Awards in tribute to Notorious B.I.G. On 15 September 1997, Sting appeared at the Music for Montserrat concert at the Royal Albert Hall, London, performing with fellow English artists Paul McCartney, Elton John, Eric Clapton, Phil Collins and Mark Knopfler.

1998–2005: Brand New Day and soundtrack work

A period of relative musical inactivity followed from 1997, before Sting eventually re-emerged in September 1999, with a new album Brand New Day, which gave him two more UK Top 20 hits in the title track "Brand New Day" (a UK No. 13 hit featuring Stevie Wonder on harmonica) and "Desert Rose" (a UK No. 15 hit). The album went Triple Platinum by January 2001. In 2000, he won Grammy Awards for Brand New Day and the song of the same name. At the awards ceremony, he performed "Desert Rose" with his collaborator on the album version, Cheb Mami.

In 2000, the soundtrack for The Emperor's New Groove was released with complete songs from the previous version of the film. The final single used to promote the film, "My Funny Friend and Me", was Sting's first nomination for an Academy Award for Best Song.

In February 2001, he won another Grammy for "She Walks This Earth (Soberana Rosa)" on A Love Affair: The Music Of Ivan Lins. His "After the Rain Has Fallen" made it into the Top 40. His next project was a live album at his villa in Figline Valdarno, released as a CD and DVD as well as being broadcast on the internet. The CD and DVD were to be entitled On Such a Night and intended to feature re-workings of Sting favourites such as "Roxanne" and "If You Love Somebody Set Them Free". The concert, scheduled for 11 September 2001, was altered due to the terrorist attacks in America that day. The webcast shut after one song (a reworked version of "Fragile"), after which Sting let the audience decide whether to continue the show. They decided to go ahead and the album and DVD appeared in November as ...All This Time, dedicated "to all those who lost their lives on that day". He performed "Fragile" with Yo-Yo Ma and the Mormon Tabernacle Choir during the opening ceremonies of the 2002 Winter Olympics in Salt Lake City, Utah, US.

In 2002, he won a Golden Globe Award for "Until..." from the film Kate & Leopold. Written and performed by him, "Until..." was his second nomination for an Academy Award for Best Song. At the 2002 Brit Awards in February, Sting received the prize for Outstanding Contribution to Music. In May 2002 he received the Ivor Novello Award for Lifetime Achievement from the British Academy of Songwriters, Composers and Authors. In June he was inducted into the Songwriters Hall of Fame. In the Queen's Birthday Honours 2003 Sting was made a Commander of the Most Excellent Order of the British Empire For services to the Music Industry. At the 54th Primetime Emmy Awards in September, Sting won an Emmy Award for Outstanding Individual Performance in a Variety Or Music Program, for his A&E special, Sting in Tuscany... All This Time.

In 2003, Sting released Sacred Love, a studio album featuring collaborations with hip-hop artist Mary J. Blige and sitar performer Anoushka Shankar. He and Blige won a Grammy for their duet, "Whenever I Say Your Name". The song is based on Johann Sebastian Bach's Praeambulum 1 C-Major (BWV 924) from the Klavierbuechlein fuer Wilhelm Friedemann Bach, though Sting said little about this adaptation. The album did not have the hit singles like his previous releases. In 2004, he was nominated for the third time for an Academy Award for Best Song, for "You Will Be My Ain True Love", from Cold Mountain, sung in duet with Alison Krauss. The pair performed the song at the 76th Academy Awards.

His autobiography Broken Music was published in October. He embarked on a Sacred Love tour in 2004 with performances by Annie Lennox. Sting went on the Broken Music tour, touring smaller venues, with a four-piece band, starting in Los Angeles on 28 March 2005 and ending on 14 May 2005. Sting was on the 2005 Monkey Business CD by hip-hop group the Black Eyed Peas, singing on "Union", which samples his Englishman in New York. Continuing with Live Aid, he appeared at Live 8 at Hyde Park, London in July 2005.

2006–2010: Experimental albums and the Police reunion

In 2006, Sting was on the Gregg Kofi Brown album, with "Lullaby to an Anxious Child" produced and arranged by Lino Nicolosi and Pino Nicolosi of Nicolosi Productions.

In October 2006, he released an album entitled Songs from the Labyrinth featuring the music of John Dowland (an Elizabethan-era composer) and accompaniment from Bosnian lute player Edin Karamazov. Sting's interpretation of this English Renaissance composer and his cooperation with Edin Karamazov brought recognition in classical music. As promotion of this album, he appeared on the fifth episode of Studio 60 to perform a segment of Dowland's "Come Again" as well as his own "Fields of Gold" in arrangement for voice and two archlutes.

On 11 February 2007, he reunited with Police to open the 2007 Grammy Awards, singing "Roxanne", and announced a reunion tour, the first concert of which was in Vancouver on 28 May 2007 for 22,000 fans. The Police toured for more than a year, beginning with North America and crossing to Europe, South America, Australia, New Zealand and Japan. Tickets for the British tour sold out within 30 minutes, the band playing two nights at Twickenham Stadium, southwest London on 8 and 9 September 2007. The last concert was at Madison Square Garden on 7 August 2008, during which his three daughters appeared with him. Toronto documentary producer Vanessa Dylyn, who was producing a film called The Musical Brain, featuring neuroscientist Daniel Levitin, approached Sting about the film. Sting was interested in having his brain scanned while different music was played. "Brand New Day" was the final song of the night for the Neighborhood Ball, one of ten inaugural balls honouring President Barack Obama on Inauguration Day, 20 January 2009. Sting was joined by Stevie Wonder on harmonica.

Sting entered the studio in early February 2009 to begin work on a new album, If on a Winter's Night..., released in October 2009. Initial reviews by fans that had access to early promotional copies were mixed, and some questioned Sting's artistic direction with this album. In 2009, Sting appeared at the Rock and Roll Hall of Fame 25th anniversary concert, playing "Higher Ground" and "Roxanne" with Stevie Wonder and "People Get Ready" with Jeff Beck. Sting himself was inducted in 2003, as a member of the Police.

In October 2009, Sting played a concert in Tashkent, Uzbekistan, for an arts and cultural festival organised by the Forum of Culture and Arts of Uzbekistan Foundation. Despite claiming he thought the concert was sponsored by UNICEF, he faced criticism in the press for receiving a payment of between one and two million pounds from Uzbek president Islam Karimov for the performance. Karimov is accused by the UN and Amnesty of human rights abuses and UNICEF stated they had no connection with the event.

2010–2016: The Last Ship and joint tours with Paul Simon and Peter Gabriel

In 2010–2011, Sting continued his Symphonicity Tour, touring South Korea, Japan, Australia, New Zealand, South America and Europe. In the second half of 2011, Sting began his Back to Bass Tour, which would continue (with periodic breaks) through 2013. In October 2010, Sting played two concerts in Arnhem, Netherlands, for Symphonica in Rosso. In 2011, Time magazine named Sting one of the 100 most influential people in the world. On 26 April he performed "Every Breath You Take", "Roxanne" and "Desert Rose" at the Time 100 Gala in New York City.

Sting recorded a song called "Power's Out" with Nicole Scherzinger. The song, originally recorded in 2007, was to have been included on Scherzinger's shelved album Her Name is Nicole. The song was released on Scherzinger's 2011 debut album Killer Love. Sting recorded a new version of the song "Let Your Soul Be Your Pilot" as a duet with Glee actor/singer Matthew Morrison, which appears on Morrison's 2011 eponymous debut album. On 15 September 2011, Sting performed "Fragile" at the 92nd Street Y in New York City, to honour the memory of his friend, financier-philanthropist Herman Sandler, who died in the 9/11 attacks on the World Trade Center.

For several years, Sting worked on a musical, The Last Ship, inspired by Sting's own childhood experiences and the shipbuilding industry in Wallsend. The Last Ship tells a story about the demise of the British shipbuilding industry in 1980s Newcastle and debuted in Chicago in June 2014 before transferring to Broadway in the autumn. Sting's eleventh studio album, titled The Last Ship and inspired by the play, was released on 24 September 2013. The album features guest artists with roots in northeast England, including Brian Johnson, vocalist from AC/DC.

In February 2014, Sting embarked on a joint concert tour titled On Stage Together with Paul Simon, playing 21 concerts in North America. The tour continued in early 2015, with ten shows in Australia and New Zealand, and 23 concerts in Europe, ending on 18 April 2015. On 26 June 2015 in Bergen, Norway (at the Bergen Calling Festival), Sting embarked on a 21-date Summer 2015 solo tour of Europe in Trondheim, Norway (at the Olavsfestdagene), visiting Denmark, France, Germany, Spain, Portugal, Italy and Sweden.

On 28 August 2015, "Stolen Car", a duet with French singer Mylène Farmer was released. It is a cover from Sting's 2003 seventh solo studio album Sacred Love and will serve as the first single from Farmer's tenth studio album, Interstellaires. On its release, the song went straight to number 1 over French iTunes music download charts, subsequently hitting number 1 on the main French singles chart and giving Sting his first number 1 in France. In 2016, Sting performed a 19-date joint concert summer tour of North America with Peter Gabriel.

2016–2020: 57th & 9th, 44/876 and My Songs
On 18 July 2016, Sting's first rock album in many years was announced. 57th & 9th was released on 11 November 2016. The title is a reference to the New York City intersection he crossed every day to get to the studio where much of the album was recorded. It has contributions by long-time band members Vinnie Colaiuta and Dominic Miller, and Jerry Fuentes and Diego Navaira of the Last Bandoleros. The album was produced by Sting's manager, Martin Kierszenbaum. On 9 November 2016, Sting performed two shows at Irving Plaza, in Manhattan, New York City, playing songs from 57th & 9th for the first time live in concert: a "57th & 9th iHeartRadio Album Release Party" show and a Sting Fan Club Member Exclusive Show later that night. Named the 57th & 9th Tour, a world tour of theatres, clubs and arenas in support of 57th & 9th (with special guests Joe Sumner and the Last Bandoleros) began on 1 February 2017 in Vancouver at the Commodore Ballroom and continued into October.

On 4 November 2016, management of the Bataclan theatre announced that Sting would perform an exclusive concert in Paris on 12 November 2016 for the re-opening of the Bataclan, a year after the terrorist attack at the venue. The Police's former guitar player, French native Henry Padovani, joined the band on stage for "Next to You", one of the encores.

Sting was announced as the joint winner of the 2017 Polar Music Prize, a Swedish international award given in recognition of excellence in the world of music. The award committee stated: "As a composer, Sting has combined classic pop with virtuoso musicianship and an openness to all genres and sounds from around the world." In 2018, he scheduled a musical and story-telling performance at the Metropolitan Museum of Art honouring Hudson River School artist Thomas Cole.

On 7 February 2018, Sting performed as special guest at the Italian Sanremo Music Festival, singing "Muoio per te", the Italian version of "Mad About You", the lyrics of which were written by his friend and colleague Zucchero Fornaciari and "Don't Make Me Wait" with Shaggy. 44/876, Sting and Shaggy's first studio album as a duo, was released in April 2018. On 21 April 2018, Sting was among the artists to perform at The Queen's Birthday Party held at the Royal Albert Hall.

Sting's fourteenth album, titled My Songs, was released on 24 May 2019. The album features 14 studio (and one live) re-recorded versions of his songs released throughout his solo career and his time with the Police. In support of the album, a world tour named the My Songs Tour started on 28 May 2019 at La Seine Musicale in Paris and ended on 2 September 2019 at Kit Carson Park in Taos, New Mexico. A 16-date residency from 22 May to 2 September 2020 at Caesars Palace in Las Vegas, Nevada was rescheduled due to COVID-19, with the first date taking place on 29 October 2021. His 6 nights at the London Palladium were rescheduled to April 2022.

On 14 April 2020, Sting recorded a duet cover of "Message in a Bottle" with the girl group All Saints. The same year, he appeared on the song "Simple" available on the EP Pausa by Ricky Martin.

2021–present: Duets and The Bridge
On 19 March 2021, Sting released Duets, a compilation album comprising 17 tracks of collaborations with various artists including Eric Clapton, Mary J. Blige, Shaggy, Annie Lennox and Sam Moore. Several titles recorded for the album were ultimately excluded from the release, such as "Simple" in performance with Ricky Martin, "Message in a Bottle" with All Saints, "Spirits" with Pato Banton from the film Ace Ventura: When Nature Calls and "Always on Your Side" in duet with Sheryl Crow.

Sting released his fifteenth studio album The Bridge on 19 November 2021. It was preceded by the release of the lead single "If It's Love" on 1 September 2021. Sting wrote the set of pop-rock songs "in a year of global pandemic, personal loss, separation, disruption, lockdown and extraordinary social and political turmoil". On 20 November 2021, Sting's single "What Could Have Been", with Ray Chen, was featured in the third act of the League of Legends animated series Arcane; this single was released the same day. Sting then opened The Game Awards 2021 with the song; Todd Marten, for the Los Angeles Times, wrote "The Game Awards began this year with an opening that might have launched the Grammy Awards".

In February 2022, it was announced that Universal Music Group purchased Sting's catalogue of solo works and those with the Police for an undisclosed amount.

In February 2022, Sting collaborated with Swedish DJ supergroup Swedish House Mafia, releasing a song and music video titled "Redlight". The song used lyrics from the Police's 1979 hit "Roxanne" with a dark electronic feeling. Sting made an appearance in the music video, the song being part of the new album from Swedish House Mafia titled Paradise Again.

The  Wall Street Journal reported that Sting gave a private performance on January 17, 2023 for fifty top Microsoft executives at the 2023 World Economic Forum at Davos. The next day Microsoft announced plans to lay off 10,000 people in what some employees called "as a bad look" for the company. "Some employees thought it wasn’t the right time for a company-sponsored Sting concert," wrote Tom Dotan and Sam Schechner. "The theme of the event was sustainability." The event quickly went viral. “The message in a bottle was you’re fired,” read one tweet, referring to the 1979 Police hit “Message in a Bottle.”

Activism

Sting's involvement in human rights began in September 1981, when Martin Lewis included him in the fourth Amnesty International gala, The Secret Policeman's Other Ball, a benefit show co-founded by Monty Python member John Cleese. Sting states, "before [the Ball] I did not know about Amnesty, I did not know about its work, I did not know about torture in the world." Following the example set at the 1979 show by Pete Townshend, Sting performed "Roxanne" and "Message in a Bottle" appearing on all four nights at Theatre Royal in London. He also led other musicians (The Secret Police) including Eric Clapton, Jeff Beck, Phil Collins, Donovan, Bob Geldof and Midge Ure in the finale – Sting's reggae-tinged arrangement of Bob Dylan's "I Shall Be Released". The event was the first time that Sting worked with Geldof. His association with Amnesty continued throughout the 1980s and beyond and he took part in Amnesty's human rights concerts.

Sting had shown his interest in social and political issues in his 1980 song "Driven to Tears", an indictment of apathy to world hunger. In November 1984, he joined Band Aid, a charity supergroup primarily made up of the biggest British and Irish musicians of the era, and sang on "Do They Know It's Christmas?" which was recorded at Sarm West Studios in Notting Hill, London. This led to the Live Aid concert in July 1985 at Wembley Stadium, in which Sting performed with Phil Collins and Dire Straits. On 2 July 2005, Sting performed at the Live 8 concert at Hyde Park, London, the follow-up to 1985's Live Aid. In 1984, Sting sang a re-worded version of "Every Breath You Take", titled "Every Bomb You Make" for episode 12 of the first series of the British satirical puppet show Spitting Image. The video for the song shows the puppets of world leaders and political figures of the day, usually with the figure matching the altered lyrics.

In June 1986, Sting reunited with the Police for the last three shows of Amnesty's six-date A Conspiracy of Hope concerts in the US. The day after the final concert, he told NBC's Today Show: "I've been a member of Amnesty and a support member for five years." In 1988, he joined musicians including Peter Gabriel and Bruce Springsteen for a six-week Human Rights Now! tour commemorating the 40th anniversary of the Universal Declaration of Human Rights.

With his wife, Trudie Styler and Raoni Metuktire, a Kayapo Indian leader in Brazil, Sting founded the Rainforest Foundation Fund to help save the rainforests and protect indigenous peoples there. In 1989, he flew to the Altamira Gathering to offer support while promoting his charity. His support continues and includes an annual benefit concert at Carnegie Hall, which has featured Billy Joel, Elton John, James Taylor and others. A species of Colombian tree frog, Dendropsophus stingi, was named after him for his "commitment and efforts to save the rainforest". In 1988, the single "They Dance Alone (Cueca Sola)" chronicled the plight of the mothers, wives and daughters of the "disappeared", political opponents killed by the Pinochet dictatorship in Chile.

On 15 September 1997, Sting joined Paul McCartney, Eric Clapton, Elton John, Phil Collins and Mark Knopfler at London's Royal Albert Hall for Music for Montserrat, a benefit for the Caribbean island devastated by a volcano. Sting and Styler were awarded the Peace Abbey Courage of Conscience award in Sherborn, Massachusetts, on 30 June 2000. In September 2001, Sting took part in America: A Tribute to Heroes singing "Fragile" to raise money for families of victims of the 9/11 attacks in the US. In February 2005, Sting performed the Leeuwin Estate Concert Series in Western Australia: the concert raised $4 million for the 2004 Indian Ocean earthquake and tsunami relief.

In 2007, Sting joined Andy Summers and Stewart Copeland for the closing set at the Live Earth concert at Giants Stadium in East Rutherford, New Jersey. Joined by John Mayer and Kanye West, Sting and the Police ended the show singing "Message in a Bottle" In 2008 Sting contributed to Songs for Tibet to support Tibet and the Dalai Lama, Tenzin Gyatso. On 22 January 2010, Sting performed "Driven to Tears" during Hope for Haiti Now. On 25 April 2010, he performed on the National Mall in Washington, D.C. in the 40th anniversary celebration of Earth Day. Sting is a patron of the Elton John AIDS Foundation. In 2010, he became a Patron of the poverty alleviation and beekeeping charity Bees for Development.

In 2011, Sting joined more than 30 others in an open letter to British Prime Minister David Cameron for "immediate decriminalisation of drug possession" if a policy review showed it had failed. Sting was quoted: "Giving young people criminal records for minor drug possession serves little purpose — it is time to think of more imaginative ways of addressing drug use in our society."

On 4 July 2011, Sting cancelled a concert for the Astana Day Festival in Astana, Kazakhstan. Amnesty International convinced him to cancel due to concerns over the rights of Kazakh oil and gas workers and their families. On 2 November 2012, Sting appeared on Hurricane Sandy: Coming Together and sang a version of "Message in a Bottle" to raise funds for those affected by a storm on the east coast of the US that week. The show reportedly raised $23 million. Sting also participated as a co-host and musician during the day-long 2015 Norwegian TV campaign, dedicated to the preservation of the rainforest.

In August 2014, Sting was one of 200 public figures who were signatories to a letter to The Guardian expressing their hope that Scotland would vote to reject Scottish independence from the UK in September's referendum on the issue.

Sting publicly opposed Brexit and supported remaining in the European Union. On 23 June 2016, in a non-binding referendum, the British public voted to leave. In October 2018, Sting was among a group of British musicians who signed an open letter sent to then Prime Minister Theresa May, drafted by Bob Geldof, calling for "a 2nd vote", stating that Brexit will "impact every aspect of the music industry. From touring to sales, to copyright legislation to royalty collation", the letter added: "We dominate the market and our bands, singers, musicians, writers, producers and engineers work all over Europe and the world and, in turn, Europe and the world come to us. Why? Because we are brilliant at it ... [Our music] reaches out, all inclusive, and embraces anyone and everyone. And that truly is what Britain is."

In January 2018, it was reported that Sting had joined the board of advisors of an impact investing fund of JANA Partners LLC named JANA Impact Capital, aimed at serving environmental and social causes. On 6 January 2018, JANA Partners, together with the California State Teachers' Retirement System issued a public letter imploring Apple Inc. to take a more responsible approach towards smartphone addiction among children. The letter cited several pieces of evidence that show that smartphone use by children increases the risk of their having mental health problems and worsens academic performance.

Personal life

Sting married actress Frances Tomelty on 1 May 1976. They had two children: Joseph (b. 23 Nov 1976), and Fuschia Katherine "Kate" (b. 17 Apr 1982) Sumner. In 1980, Sting became a tax exile in Galway, Ireland. In 1982, after the birth of his second child, he separated from Tomelty. Tomelty and Sting divorced in 1984 following Sting's affair with actress Trudie Styler. The split was controversial; as The Independent reported in 2006, Tomelty "just happened to be Trudie's best friend (Sting and Frances lived next door to Trudie in Bayswater, west London, for several years before the two of them became lovers)".

Sting married Styler at Camden Registry Office on 20 August 1992, and the couple had their wedding blessed two days later in the twelfth-century parish church of St Andrew in Great Durnford, Wiltshire, south-west England. Sting and Styler have four children: Brigitte Michael “Mickey” (b. 19 Jan 1984), Jake (b. 24 May 1985), Eliot Paulina "Coco" (b. 30 Jul 1990), and Giacomo Luke (b. 17 Dec 1995) Sumner. Coco is founder and lead singer of the group I Blame Coco. Giacomo Luke is the inspiration behind the name of Kentucky Derby-winning horse Giacomo.

In April 2009, the Sunday Times Rich List estimated Sting's wealth at £175million and ranked him the 322nd wealthiest person in Britain. A decade later, Sting was estimated to have a fortune of £320million in the 2019 Sunday Times Rich List, making him one of the ten wealthiest people in the British music industry.

Both of Sting's parents died of cancer: his mother in 1986 and his father in 1987. He did not attend either funeral, in order not to draw media attention to them.

In 1995, Sting gave evidence in court against his former accountant (Keith Moore), who had misappropriated £6 million of his money. Moore was jailed for six years. Sting owns several homes worldwide, including Lake House and its sixty-acre estate near Salisbury, Wiltshire; a New York City flat (which was once owned by Billy Joel) and the Villa Il Palagio estate in Figline Valdarno, Tuscany.  He owned a house in Highgate, 2 The Grove for a number of years, which had previously been the former home of the violinist Yehudi Menuhin.

For much of his life, Sting's spare time interests and activities have revolved around mental and physical fitness. For many years, he ran five miles (8 km) a day and also performed aerobics. He participated in running races at Parliament Hill and charity runs (including the Race Against Time for Sport Aid in both 1986 and 1988). Around 1990, Danny Paradise introduced him to yoga and he began practising the Ashtanga Vinyasa Yoga series, though he now practises Tantra and Jivamukti Yoga as well. He wrote a foreword to Yoga Beyond Belief, written by Ganga White in 2007. In 2008, he was reported to practise Maharishi Mahesh Yogi's Transcendental Meditation technique. He also practices pilates regularly.

Sting's affinity with yoga contributed to a rumour about his sexual prowess, including a purported eight hours of sex with Styler. The story stems from an interview with Sting and Bob Geldof. A journalist asked "how do you perform in bed?" and Geldof remarked that he was a "three-minute man" but Sting could last for hours thanks to yoga.

Also a keen chess player, Sting played chess grandmaster Garry Kasparov in an exhibition game in 2000, along with four bandmates: Dominic Miller, Jason Rebello, Chris Botti and Russ Irwin. Kasparov beat all five simultaneously within fifty minutes.

In 1969, Sting read the Gormenghast trilogy by Mervyn Peake and later bought the film rights. He named pets, a racehorse, his publishing company and one of his daughters (Fuschia, in the books actually Fuchsia) after characters from the books.

Sting supports his hometown Premier League football club Newcastle United and in 2009 backed a supporters' campaign against the plan of owner Mike Ashley to sell off naming rights of the club's home stadium St James' Park. He wrote a song in support of Newcastle, called "Black and White Army (Bringing The Pride Back Home)".

In a 2011 interview in Time, Sting said that he was agnostic and that the certainties of religious faith were dangerous.

In August 2013, Sting donated money to The Friends of Tynemouth Outdoor Pool to regenerate the 1920s lido at the southern end of Longsands Beach in Tynemouth, northeast England, a few miles from where he was born.

Awards and nominations

Discography

Studio albums
 The Dream of the Blue Turtles (1985)
 ...Nothing Like the Sun (1987)
 The Soul Cages (1991)
 Ten Summoner's Tales (1993)
 Mercury Falling (1996)
 Brand New Day (1999)
 Sacred Love (2003)
 Songs from the Labyrinth (2006)
 If on a Winter's Night... (2009)
 Symphonicities (2010) 
 The Last Ship (2013)
 57th & 9th (2016)
 44/876 (2018) (with Shaggy)
 My Songs (2019)
 The Bridge (2021)

Filmography
Sting has also ventured into acting. Film, television and radio roles include:

As actor
 Quadrophenia (1979) – The Ace Face, the King of the Mods, a.k.a. the Bell Boy in the film adaptation of the Who album.
 Radio On (1979) – Just Like Eddie
 The Great Rock 'n' Roll Swindle (1980) – Leader of the Blow Waves. The footage was cut but it later reappeared in the DVD version and in the documentary The Filth and the Fury (2000).
 Artemis 81 (1981) – The angel Helith (BBC TV film)
 Brimstone and Treacle (1982) – Martin Taylor, a drifter
 Dune (1984) – Feyd-Rautha Harkonnen
 Titus Groan (1984) – Steerpike (BBC Radio 4 broadcast based on the Mervyn Peake novel)
 Gormenghast (1984) – Steerpike (BBC Radio 4 broadcast based on the Mervyn Peake novel)
 Plenty (1985) – Mick, a black-marketeer
 The Bride (1985) – Baron Frankenstein
 Walking to New Orleans (1985) – Busker, singing Moon Over Bourbon Street.
 The Adventures of Baron Munchausen (1988) – a "heroic officer"
 Stormy Monday (1988) – Finney, a nightclub owner
 Julia and Julia (1988) – Daniel, a British gentleman
 The Grotesque (1995), a/k/a Gentlemen Don't Eat Poets and Grave Indiscretion – Fledge
 Lock, Stock and Two Smoking Barrels (1998) – J.D., Eddie's father and owner of a bar.
 Kaamelott: The First Chapter (2021) – Horsa

As himself
 Urgh! A Music War (1982)
 Bring On the Night (1985)
 Saturday Night Live (1991) – host, various
 The Simpsons episode "Radio Bart" (1992)
 The Smell of Reeves and Mortimer Episode 5 (1995)
 The Larry Sanders Show episode "Where Is the Love?" (1996)
 Ally McBeal season four episode "Cloudy Skies, Chance of Parade" (2001)
 Everyone Stares: The Police Inside Out (2006)
 Studio 60 on Sunset Strip (2006)
 Vicar of Dibley Comic Relief special (2007)
 Bee Movie (2007)
  Little Britain USA (2008) as Stomp, the lead singer of "the Cops" (playing "Fields of Gold")
 Brüno (2009)
 Still Bill (2009)
 Do It Again (2010)
 Life's Too Short (2011)
 2012: Time for Change (2011)
 The Michael J. Fox Show (2013) (singing "August Wind" from The Last Ship)
 20 Feet from Stardom (2013)
 Zoolander 2 (2016)
 Have a Good Trip: Adventures in Psychedelics (2020)
 Only Murders in the Building (2021)

Sting narrated the American premiere of the musical Yanomamo (1983), by Peter Rose and Anne Conlon, outlining problems that existed in the Amazon rainforest. This was made into a film and later broadcast as Song of the Forest. He also provided the voice of Zarm on the 1990s television show Captain Planet and the Planeteers. In 1989 he starred as Macheath (Mack the Knife) in John Dexter's Broadway production of The Threepenny Opera. Sting also appeared as himself in the video game Guitar Hero World Tour. In 2018, Sting voiced the narrator of Where the Water Tastes Like Wine.

Theatre

Broadway

Publications

See also 
 Album era
 List of number-one hits (United States)
 List of artists who reached number one on the Hot 100 (U.S.)
 List of number-one dance hits (United States)
 List of artists who reached number one on the U.S. Dance chart
 Mononymous persons

Notes

References

Bibliography

External links

 
 
 
 
 
 
 Sting's Commencement Address (1994) to the Berklee College of Music
 Sting radio interview about John Dowland songs, from NPR Performance Today, 6 March 2007
 Sting  live in Minsk (video) on the Belarus official website 

 
1951 births
20th-century English male actors
20th-century English male singers
20th-century English singers
21st-century double-bassists
21st-century English male singers
21st-century English singers
A&M Records artists
Alumni of Northumbria University
Annie Award winners
Brit Award winners
British soft rock musicians
Chevaliers of the Ordre des Arts et des Lettres
Commanders of the Order of the British Empire
Deutsche Grammophon artists
English activists
English agnostics
English classical double-bassists
English classical singers
English expatriates in Italy
English expatriates in the United States
English lutenists
English male film actors
English new wave musicians
English rock bass guitarists
Male bass guitarists
English rock singers
English male singer-songwriters
English tenors
English autobiographers
English yogis
Golden Globe Award-winning musicians
Grammy Award winners
Indigenous rights activists
Ivor Novello Award winners
Kennedy Center honorees
Living people
Male double-bassists
Male new wave singers
Musicians from Newcastle upon Tyne
People educated at St. Cuthbert's School
People from Cramlington
Musicians from Northumberland
People from Wallsend
Male actors from Tyne and Wear
The Police members
Primetime Emmy Award winners
Reggae rock musicians
Rock double-bassists
Schoolteachers from Northumberland
Strontium 90 (band) members
Sumner musical family
Universal Music Group artists
Pseudonyms
British reggae musicians